Myrtle Cole  is an American politician in San Diego, California. She was a member of the San Diego City Council representing City Council District 4 from 2013 until 2018. Cole served as president of the City Council from 2017 until 2018. In 2018 Cole lost a bid for reelection, becoming one of the first incumbent council members to lose a reelection campaign since 1992. She was the first African American woman elected to the city council. She is a Democrat, although city council positions are officially nonpartisan per California state law.

San Diego City Council 

Myrtle Cole was first elected to office in the 2013 special election to fill the District 4 seat of the city council vacated by Tony Young,. District 4 includes the neighborhoods of Alta Vista, Broadway Heights, Chollas View, Emerald Hills, Encanto, Greater Skyline Hills, Jamacha, Lincoln Park, Lomita Village, North Bay Terrace, Oak Park, O'Farrell, Paradise Hills, Redwood Village, Rolando Park, South Bay Terrace, Valencia Park, and Webster. She won re-election to a four-year term in the June 2014 primary election, drawing 57% of the primary votes. Her second term began in December 2014.

In December 2016, Cole ran against fellow Democrat David Alvarez for the position of council president. The council president is responsible for setting the council's agenda and making committee assignments and chairmanships. Cole was chosen by her colleagues on a 6–3 vote, securing the votes of all four Republicans on the City Council as well as Democrat Barbara Bry. Although both Cole and Alvarez were Democrats, Cole was seen as the more moderate of the two.

In the November 2018 election, Cole lost her reelection bid to civil rights attorney and former staffer Monica Montgomery. This marked the first time that an incumbent had failed to be reelected to the City Council since 1992.

Electoral history

References

Living people
San Diego City Council members
California Democrats
African-American women in politics
Women city councillors in California
Year of birth missing (living people)
African-American city council members in California
21st-century African-American people
21st-century African-American women